Holy water is water that has been blessed in a religious ceremony. See also:
 Holy water in Eastern Christianity

Holy water may also refer to:
 Holy Water (Wendy Oldfield album), 2002
 Holy Water (Bad Company album), 1990
 Holy Water (We the Kingdom album), 2020
 "Holy Water" (Big & Rich song), 2004
 "Holy Water" (Galantis song) , 2019
 "Holy Water" (Madonna song), 2015
 "Holy Water" (The Triffids song), 1988
 "Holy Water" (We the Kingdom song), 2019
 "Holy Water" (WhoCares song), song of musical project WhoCares, part of the 2-track single release "Out of My Mind / Holy Water"
 "Holy Water", a song by JP Cooper
 "Holy Water", a song by Freya Ridings
 "Holy Water", a song by Soundgarden from Badmotorfinger
 "Holy Water", a song by the Tom Tom Club from The Good, the Bad, and the Funky
 Holy Water (film), 2009

See also 
 Sacred water (disambiguation)